Dmitry Vladimirovich Klitsov (born 13 February 1988) is a former Russian professional association football player.

Club career
He played in the Russian Football National League for FC Dynamo Bryansk in 2008.

See also
Football in Russia

References

External links

1988 births
Living people
Russian footballers
Association football midfielders
FC Dynamo Bryansk players